Sam Walton (1918–1992) was an American businessman and entrepreneur best known for founding Walmart and Sam's Club.

Sam Walton may also refer to:

 Sam Walton (American football) (1943–2002), American football tackle
 Sam Walton (peace activist), a British Quaker peace activist

See also
 Sam M. Walton College of Business, the business college at the University of Arkansas
 Samuel Robson Walton (born 1944), American billionaire and former chairman of Walmart